Pratt Mountain is a  summit within the Wapack Range of mountains in south-central New Hampshire, United States. It lies within the town of New Ipswich and is traversed by the  Wapack Trail. The subordinate peak, Stony Top, forms the north shoulder of the mountain. Pratt Mountain offers expansive views from rocky ledges along its length.

New Ipswich Mountain is located directly to the north along the Wapack ridgeline; to the southeast rise Binney Hill , Emerson Hill , Nutting Hill , and Mount Watatic, the southern terminus of the Wapack Range.

The east side of the mountain drains into the Souhegan River watershed, to the Merrimack River thence the Atlantic Ocean; the west and south sides drain into the Millers River watershed, to the Connecticut River, thence into Long Island Sound. Binney Pond, located in Binney Pond State Forest along the Wapack ridgecrest between Pratt Mountain and Binney Hill, is known for a biodiversity of rare plants and salamanders.

References

 Southern New Hampshire Trail Guide (1999). Boston: The Appalachian Mountain Club.
 Flanders, John ( 1991) Wapack Trail Guide. West Peterborough, New Hampshire: Friends of the Wapack. 

External links
 Friends of the Wapack

Mountains of Hillsborough County, New Hampshire
Mountains of New Hampshire